Hwang In-beom (born 20 September 1996) is a South Korean professional footballer who plays as a midfielder for Super League Greece club Olympiacos and the South Korea national team.

Club career
Hwang signed with Daejeon Citizen in 2015. He scored his first goal in a league match against Pohang Steelers on 30 May and became the youngest scorer in Daejeon history. Hwang interested Hamburger SV after showing positive prospects in Daejeon and national team, but Daejeon sold Hwang to Vancouver Whitecaps FC which offered 
more transfer fees than Hamburg.

On 30 January 2019, Hwang joined Major League Soccer side Vancouver Whitecaps as a Young Designated Player on a two-year contract, with club options for the 2021 and 2022 seasons. He made his debut for the Whitecaps against Minnesota United on 2 March, and scored his first goal for the side in a 1–0 win over Los Angeles FC on 17 April. In the 30th week of the 2019 season, Hwang was selected for the Team of the Week after providing three assists against LA Galaxy,

On 14 August 2020, Hwang transferred to Russian club Rubin Kazan. He was one of the best playmakers in the Russian Premier League until the middle of the 2020–21 season, but suffered coronavirus and heel injury afterward.

On 3 April 2022, Hwang's contract with Rubin was suspended until 30 June 2022 according to special FIFA regulations related to the Russian invasion of Ukraine. The regulations allow foreign players in Russia to suspend their contracts until the end of the 2021–22 season and sign with a club outside of Russia until that date. Hwang joined FC Seoul on 5 April.

On 29 July 2022, Hwang joined Super League Greece club Olympiacos. On 18 August 2022, he scored, on his debut, the equaliser in a Europa League playoff fixture away at Apollon Limassol, which finished 1–1.

International career
Hwang played a vital role in leading South Korea to the 2018 Asian Games title. As a reward, he was discharged from Asan Mugunghwa less than halfway through his military service and returned to Daejeon Citizen.

Hwang made his senior international debut in September 2018, and later that year, he scored his first senior international goal in a 2–2 friendly home draw against Panama on 16 October.

In the 2019 AFC Asian Cup, Hwang showed impressive play and was selected for ESPN's Team of the Tournament. He was also named the Most Valuable Player of the 2019 EAFF Championship after leading South Korea to the title.

Style of play
J.J. Adams of The National Post noted that Hwang "can play centrally or on the wing, but thrives as an attacking mid — a box-to-box No. 8. He’s known for precision passing, aggressive tackling, possession composure and a willingness to take on defenders with the ball at his feet".

Career statistics

Club

International

Scores and results list South Korea's goal tally first.

Honours
South Korea U23
Asian Games: 2018

South Korea
EAFF Championship: 2019

Individual
K League 2 Best XI: 2016, 2017, 2018
EAFF Championship Most Valuable Player: 2019
Super League Greece Player of the Month: February 2023

Notes

References

External links

 Hwang In-beom – National Team Stats at KFA 
 
 
 

1996 births
Living people
South Korean footballers
Association football midfielders
Daejeon Hana Citizen FC players
K League 1 players
Sportspeople from Daejeon
South Korea under-17 international footballers
South Korea under-20 international footballers
South Korea under-23 international footballers
South Korea international footballers
Footballers at the 2018 Asian Games
Asian Games medalists in football
Asian Games gold medalists for South Korea
Medalists at the 2018 Asian Games
2019 AFC Asian Cup players
Vancouver Whitecaps FC players
FC Rubin Kazan players
FC Seoul players
Olympiacos F.C. players
Designated Players (MLS)
Major League Soccer players
Russian Premier League players
Super League Greece players
South Korean expatriate footballers
Expatriate soccer players in Canada
Expatriate footballers in Russia
Expatriate footballers in Greece
South Korean expatriate sportspeople in Russia
South Korean expatriate sportspeople in Canada
South Korean expatriate sportspeople in Greece
2022 FIFA World Cup players